Oliver Davies (born 14 October 2000) is an Australian cricketer. He made his Twenty20 debut on 22 December 2020, for the Sydney Thunder, in the 2020–21 Big Bash League season. Prior to his Twenty20 debut, he was named in Australia's squad for the 2020 Under-19 Cricket World Cup. He made his List A debut on 15 February 2021, for New South Wales in the 2020–21 Marsh One-Day Cup. He made his First class debut on 2 March 2023, for New South Wales in the 2022–23 Sheffield Shield season.

Personal life
Ollie attended St Paul's College, Manly and was in the same year as soccer player Calem Nieuwenhof. His younger brother, Joel Davies, is also a cricketer, who signed with Sydney Thunder during the 2022/23 Big Bash League season. Through their mum, the Davies brothers are eligible to get a Trinidad passport and grew up supporting both Australia and the West Indies.

References

External links
 

Living people
2000 births
Australian cricketers
New South Wales cricketers
Sydney Thunder cricketers
Cricketers from New South Wales